The Syrian Wars were a series of six wars between the Seleucid Empire and the Ptolemaic Kingdom of Egypt, successor states to Alexander the Great's empire, during the 3rd and 2nd centuries BC over the region then called Coele-Syria, one of the few avenues into Egypt. These conflicts drained the material and manpower of both parties and led to their eventual destruction and conquest by Rome and Parthia. They are briefly mentioned in the biblical Books of the Maccabees.

Background 
In the Wars of the Diadochi following Alexander's death, Coele-Syria initially came under the rule of Antigonus I Monophthalmus. In 301 BC Ptolemy I Soter, who four years earlier had crowned himself King of Egypt, exploited events surrounding the Battle of Ipsus to take control of the region. The victors at Ipsus, however, had allocated Coele-Syria to Ptolemy's former ally Seleucus I Nicator, founder of the Seleucid Empire. Seleucus, who had been aided by Ptolemy during his ascent to power, did not take any military action to reclaim the region. Once both were dead, however, their successors became embroiled in war.

First Syrian War (274–271 BC)

A decade into his rule, Ptolemy II faced Antiochus I, the Seleucid king who was trying to expand his empire's holdings in Syria and Anatolia. Ptolemy proved to be a forceful ruler and skilled general.  In addition, his recent marriage to his court-wise sister Arsinoe II of Egypt had stabilized the volatile Egyptian court, allowing Ptolemy to successfully carry out the campaign.

The First Syrian War was a major victory for the Ptolemies. Antiochus took the Ptolemaic controlled areas in coastal Syria and southern Anatolia in his initial rush. Ptolemy reconquered these territories by 271 BC, extending Ptolemaic rule as far as Caria and into most of Cilicia. With Ptolemy's eye focused eastward, his half-brother Magas declared his province of Cyrenaica to be independent. It would remain independent until 250 BC, when it was reabsorbed into the Ptolemaic Kingdom: but not before having triggered a sequence of Ptolemaic and Seleucid court intrigues, war and ultimately leading to the marriage of Theos and Berenice.

Second Syrian War (260–253 BC)

Antiochus II succeeded his father in 261 BC, and thus began a new war for Syria. He reached an agreement with the current Antigonid king in Macedon, Antigonus II Gonatas, who was also interested in pushing Ptolemy II out of the Aegean. With Macedon's support, Antiochus II launched an attack on Ptolemaic outposts in Asia.

Most of the information about the Second Syrian War has been lost. It is clear that Antigonus' fleet defeated Ptolemy's at the Battle of Cos in 261 BC, diminishing Ptolemaic naval power. Ptolemy appears to have lost ground in Cilicia, Pamphylia, and Ionia, while Antiochus regained Miletus and Ephesus. Macedon's involvement in the war ceased when Antigonus became preoccupied by the rebellion of Corinth and Chalcis in 253 BC, possibly instigated by Ptolemy, as well as an increase in enemy activity along Macedon's northern frontier.

The war was concluded around 253 BC with the marriage of Antiochus to Ptolemy's daughter, Berenice Syra. Antiochus repudiated his previous wife, Laodice, and turned over substantial domain to her. He died in Ephesus in 246 BC, poisoned by Laodice according to some sources.  Ptolemy II died in the same year.

Third Syrian War (246–241 BC)
 
Also known as the Laodicean War, the Third Syrian War began with one of the many succession crises that plagued the Hellenistic states. Antiochus II left two ambitious mothers, his repudiated wife Laodice and Ptolemy II's daughter Berenice Syra, in a competition to put their respective sons on the throne. Laodice claimed that Antiochus had named her son heir while on his deathbed, but Berenice argued that her newly born son was the legitimate heir. Berenice asked her brother Ptolemy III, the new Ptolemaic king, to come to Antioch and help place her son on the throne. When Ptolemy arrived, Berenice and her child had been assassinated.

Ptolemy declared war on Laodice's newly crowned son, Seleucus II, in 246 BC, and campaigned with great success (his forces possibly being commanded by Xanthippus of Sparta, aka Xanthippus of Carthage, the mercenary general responsible for defeating a Roman army at Tunis/Bagrades in 255 BC). He won major victories over Seleucus in Syria and Anatolia, briefly occupied Antioch and, as a recent cuneiform discovery proves, even reached Babylon. These victories were marred by the loss of the Cyclades to Antigonus Gonatas in the Battle of Andros. Seleucus had his own difficulties. His domineering mother asked him to grant co-regency to his younger brother, Antiochus Hierax, as well as rule over Seleucid territories in Anatolia. Antiochus promptly declared independence, undermining Seleucus' efforts to defend against Ptolemy.

In exchange for a peace in 241 BC, Ptolemy was awarded new territories on the northern coast of Syria, including Seleucia Pieria, the port of Antioch. The Ptolemaic kingdom was at the height of its power.

Fourth Syrian War (219–217 BC)

Upon taking the Seleucid throne in 223 BC, Antiochus III the Great (241–187 BC) set himself the task of restoring the lost imperial possessions of Seleucus I Nicator, which extended from Greco-Bactrian Kingdom in the east, the Hellespont in the north, and Syria in the south. By 221 BC, he had re-established Seleucid control over Media and Persia, which had been in rebellion. The ambitious king turned his eyes toward Syria and Egypt.

Egypt had been significantly weakened by court intrigue and public unrest. The rule of the newly inaugurated Ptolemy IV Philopator (reigned 221–204 BC) began with the murder of queen-mother Berenice II. The young king quickly fell under the absolute influence of imperial courtiers. His ministers used their absolute power in their own self-interest, to the people's great chagrin.

Antiochus sought to take advantage of this chaotic situation. After an invasion in 221 BC failed to launch, he finally began the Fourth Syrian War in 219 BC. He recaptured Seleucia Pieria as well as cities in Phoenicia, amongst them Tyre. Rather than promptly invading Egypt, Antiochus waited in Phoenicia for over a year, consolidating his new territories and listening to diplomatic proposals from the Ptolemaic kingdom.

Meanwhile, Ptolemy's minister Sosibius began recruiting and training an army. He recruited not only from the local Greek population, as Hellenistic armies generally were, but also from the native Egyptians, enrolling at least thirty thousand natives as phalangites. This innovation paid off, but it would eventually have dire consequences for Ptolemaic stability. In the summer of 217 BC, Ptolemy engaged and defeated the long-delayed Antiochus in the Battle of Raphia, the largest battle since the Battle of Ipsus over eighty years earlier.

Ptolemy's victory preserved his control over Coele-Syria, and the weak king declined to advance further into Antiochus' empire, even to retake Seleucia Pieria. The Ptolemaic kingdom would continue to weaken over the following years, suffering from economic problems and rebellion. Nationalist sentiment had developed among the native Egyptians who had fought at Raphia. Confident and well-trained, they broke from Ptolemy in what is known as the Egyptian Revolt, establishing their own kingdom in Upper Egypt which the Ptolemies finally reconquered around 185 BC.

Fifth Syrian War (202–195 BC)

The death of Ptolemy IV in 204 BC was followed by a bloody conflict over the regency as his heir, Ptolemy V, was just a child. The conflict began with the murder of the dead king's wife and sister Arsinoë by the ministers Agothocles and Sosibius. The fate of Sosibius is unclear, but Agothocles seems to have held the regency for some time until he was lynched by the volatile Alexandrian mob. The regency was passed from one adviser to another, and the kingdom was in a state of near anarchy.

Seeking to take advantage of this turmoil, Antiochus III staged a second invasion of Coele-Syria. He convinced Philip V of Macedon to join the war and conquer the Ptolemies' territories in Asia Minor – actions which led to the Second Macedonian War between Macedon and the Romans. Antiochus quickly swept through the region. After a brief setback at Gaza, he delivered a crushing blow to the Ptolemies at the Battle of Panium near the head of the River Jordan which earned him the important port of Sidon.

In 200 BC, Roman emissaries came to Philip and Antiochus demanding that they refrain from invading Egypt. The Romans would suffer no disruption of the import of grain from Egypt, key to supporting the massive population in Italy. As neither monarch had planned to invade Egypt itself, they willingly complied to Rome's demands. Antiochus completed the subjugation of Coele-Syria in 198 BC and went on to raid Ptolemy's remaining coastal strongholds in Caria and Cilicia.

Problems at home led Ptolemy to seek a quick and disadvantageous conclusion. The nativist movement, which began before the war with the Egyptian Revolt and expanded with the support of Egyptian priests, created turmoil and sedition throughout the kingdom. Economic troubles led the Ptolemaic government to increase taxation, which in turn fed the nationalist fire. In order to focus on the home front, Ptolemy signed a conciliatory treaty with Antiochus in 195 BC, leaving the Seleucid king in possession of Coele-Syria and agreeing to marry Antiochus' daughter Cleopatra I.

Sixth Syrian War (170–168 BC)

Background (195–170 BC)
The Seleucids had little desire to entangle themselves in a new war with the Ptolemies.  After losing the Roman-Seleucid War, they were forced to pay a huge indemnity that the Roman Republic imposed on them at the Treaty of Apamea in 188 BC.  They already controlled Coele-Syria, and were busy with fending off the rising Parthian Empire in the East.

Internal dissent and rebellions weakened the Ptolemies over time.  In particular, the power of the monarchy waned, and the influence of aristocrats of high standing in Alexandria grew, as did the power of Egyptian nativist movements.  Ptolemy V seemed to possibly be intending to raise funds to finance an attempt to reclaim Coele-Syria, but died unexpectedly in 180 BC; in the paranoid atmosphere of the era, many assumed he had been poisoned, perhaps by courtiers who wished to keep the peace and avoid taxes or levies to finance a war, or because they preferred a young king and regent who would be easier to manipulate.  Cleopatra, the regent, favored the peace faction at court, whether because she agreed a war made no sense, or because of lingering loyalties to the Seleucid royal family she descended from.  Cleopatra I died in 176 BC, but her eldest son Ptolemy VI Philometor was still only 10 years old, necessitating a continued regency.  Eulaeus and Lenaeus, a eunuch and a slave, became the two regents of the young king of Egypt, likely as a compromise between the relevant Egyptian factions who could not bear to see a rival on the throne who might have the backing and lineage to claim it themselves.  Under the regents, the young Ptolemy VI was married to his sister Cleopatra II and she was declared a co-ruler.

Sixth War
The causes of the new conflict are obscure.  Relations declined between the two powers, with both sending emissaries to Rome (then bogged down in the Third Macedonian War) asking for military support against the other before the war even started. In 170 BC, Ptolemy's younger sibling Ptolemy VIII Physcon was declared a co-ruler as well in order to bolster the unity of Egypt; the three siblings ranged from 10 to 16 years of age.  While the causes are still not entirely clear, Ptolemaic regents Eulaeus and Lenaeus seem to have instigated the formal declaration of war on Seleucid ruler Antiochus IV Epiphanes.  This was possibly out of a desire to find a unifying issue to rally the state around, possibly due to political gains in the pro-war faction, and likely influenced by a vast misunderstanding of how easy it would be to win such a war.  Antiochus IV had gotten word of Egyptian preparations for war and was in Tyre in July and August 170 BC preparing his forces, and reached the important strategic town of Pelusium in November 170 BC.  Just as the Ptolemaic army moved out of Pelusium to begin its invasion of Coele-Syria, the Seleucids defeated the Ptolemaic army in the Sinai desert, perhaps due to Egyptian surprise at the Seleucids being ready to fight immediately.  Ptolemaic losses mounted as they retreated to Pelusium, but Pelusium quickly fell with little loss of life and a surrender of the Ptolemaic army.  Pelusium was the gateway to the rest of Egypt; with it under control, Seleucid supply lines were secure, and Egypt was in grave danger.  Antiochus took Naucratis and camped near Alexandria, potentially threatening a siege.

The Egyptians suffered internal unrest over the poor progress of the war: Eulaeus and Lenaeus were overthrown and replaced by two new regents, Comanus and Cineas.  Envoys were sent to negotiate a peace treaty.  Antiochus took Ptolemy VI (who was his nephew) under his guardianship, perhaps with the intent of making Egypt a client state subordinate to Seleucid power.  Archaeological records show that even Thebes in the southern part of Egypt were occupied by a foreign army (surely the Seleucids) in October 169 BC.  However, this occupation was unacceptable to the people of Alexandria who responded by proclaiming Ptolemy Physcon as sole king. Antiochus besieged Alexandria but he was unable to cut communications to the city so, in late autumn of 169, he withdrew his army, leaving Ptolemy VI as a rival king in Memphis.  Antiochus possibly withdrew to deal with problems in Phoenicia at home. 

In Antiochus's absence, Ptolemy VI and his brother Ptolemy Physcon were reconciled, possibly after a brief civil struggle. Antiochus, angered at his loss of control over the king, invaded again in 168 BC. The Egyptians sent to Rome asking for help and the Senate dispatched Gaius Popilius Laenas to Alexandria. Meanwhile, a Seleucid fleet seized Cyprus, and Antiochus's army took Memphis again.  While at Memphis, he even issued an official decree as Egyptian king.  The Ptolemaic armies failed to offer any major field battles, instead staying fortified in garrisons.  Antiochus was now prepared to march on the capital of Alexandria again. At Eleusis, on the outskirts of Alexandria, he met Popilius Laenas, with whom he had been friends during his stay in Rome. But instead of a friendly welcome, Popilius offered the king an ultimatum from the Roman Senate: he must evacuate Egypt and Cyprus immediately. Rome had only just recently defeated the Macedonians at the Battle of Pydna, potentially freeing up armies with which it could credibly threaten the Seleucids with. Antiochus begged to have time to consider but Popilius drew a circle round him in the sand with his cane and told him to decide before he stepped outside it. Antiochus chose to obey the Roman ultimatum to avoid a new Roman–Seleucid War, a retreat that Polybius described as personally humiliating for Antiochus.  The "Day of Eleusis" ended the Sixth Syrian War and Antiochus' hopes of conquering Egyptian territory.  Still, the Ptolemies were greatly weakened by the war as well as the conflict between Ptolemy VI and VIII.  A rebel named Dionysus Petrosarapis would attempt to exploit the animosity between the two Ptolemy brothers and start a series of revolts from 168–164 BC.

Ptolemy VI's intervention in the Seleucid Dynastic Wars 

While not usually classed as the "Seventh Syrian War", the Ptolemies and a portion of the Seleucids would clash again in 145 BC.  The Seleucid Empire began to fall to internal disorder in 152 BC as the Romans and Pergamese, seeking to destabilize and weaken Syria, encouraged Alexander Balas to make a hostile claim on the throne against King Demetrius I Soter.  Alexander's allies funded him and hired mercenaries on his behalf, and he was able to gain the loyalty of those of Syria who disliked Demetrius, such as Jewish military leader Jonathan Apphus.  Alexander eventually won the civil war, a diplomatic coup for Ptolemy VI who saw a competent, ambitious, and hostile Seleucid rival in Demetrius replaced by an opportunist in Balas.  Ptolemy VI's daughter Cleopatra Thea married Alexander Balas as a gesture of friendship.

However, this peace was not to last.  Demetrius II, Demetrius I's son, made a play to overthrow Balas, who gained a reputation as a weak ruler (whether deserved or not).  The civil war resumed, and Egyptian forces massed on the border around 147 BC, ready to intervene in the Seleucid civil war.  With Alexander's permission, they occupied much of coastal Coele-Syria, with the cooperation of Alexander's Jewish allies who expanded and took over more of the Judean hills and interior.  As Ptolemy VI marched north, he switched sides and demanded his son-in-law hand over his chief minister on likely faked charges.  Presumably Demetrius II had offered to legitimize Ptolemaic rule of Coele-Syria if he switched to aiding his faction.  Ptolemy VI now marched on Antioch; Alexander abandoned the city, apparently disliking his chances in a siege.  Ptolemy VI now ruled from Syria itself, with Demetrius II as a puppet; Cleopatra Thea was remarried to the new king.  Alexander Balas's loyalists harassed the countryside outside of Antioch.  Eventually, Ptolemy VI rallied his forces and the Ptolemaic-Demetrius II coalition went to meet him at a nearby river.  The Battle of the Oenoparus resulted.  Alexander's army was defeated, and he was forced to flee to his Nabatean (Arab) allies, where he was murdered by two of his own men.  Ptolemy VI died of wounds.  The unexpected winner was thus Demetrius II who, with the Ptolemaic king dead and the Seleucids briefly unified, turned on his former Egyptian allies and was able to banish the Ptolemaic occupation force out of Coele-Syria.

See also
 Hellenistic period
 List of conflicts in Egypt

References

Bibliography

Further reading

 
3rd-century BC conflicts
2nd-century BC conflicts
Wars involving the Seleucid Empire
Wars involving the Ptolemaic Kingdom